Good Love & Heartbreak is the twenty-fourth studio album by American country music singer-songwriter Tammy Wynette. It was released on November 1, 1982, by Epic Records.

Commercial performance 
The album peaked at No. 62 on the Billboard Country Albums chart. The album's first single, "A Good Night's Love", peaked at No. 19 on the Billboard Country Singles chart, and the second single, "I Just Heard a Heart Break (And I'm So Afraid It's Mine)", peaked at No. 46.

Track listing

Personnel
Adapted from the album liner notes.

David Briggs - keyboards
Jimmy Capps - acoustic guitar
Jerry Carrigan - drums, percussion
Mike Douchette - harmonica
Andy Engel - artwork, color tinting
Sonny Garrish - steel guitar
Mike Leech - bass
Rick McCollister - engineer
Farrell Morris - percussion
Weldon Myrick - steel guitar
George Richey - producer
Judy Rodman - background vocals
Norman Seeff - photography
Henry Strzelecki - bass
Wendellyn Suits - background vocals
Pete Wade - lead guitar
D. Bergen White - background vocals, string arrangements
Dennis Wilson - background vocals
Tammy Wynette - lead vocals
Chip Young - acoustic guitar

Chart positions

Album

Singles

References

1982 albums
Tammy Wynette albums
Epic Records albums
Albums produced by George Richey